Eurytoma obtusiventris is a parasitoid of Eurosta solidaginis. It can be found in North America. The wasp attacks after oviposition but prior to the formation of a gall. Eurytoma obtusiventris prompts the Eurosta solidaginis larvae to create a pupa, which the wasp will use after consuming its host.

References

Hymenoptera of North America
Parasitic wasps
Insects described in 1934
Eurytomidae